Role-playing game software, as opposed to role-playing video games, is a software intended to assist in developing and running of role-playing games. It does not allow the game to be played entirely within the computer. Such software assist in the drawing of maps, player character and non-player character creation, generation of monsters, and provision of dice rolls and their results. The software may be specific to a single role playing game system, or flexible enough to be applied to multiple game models.

Software

References

Role-playing game software